is a Japanese professional tennis player.

Primarily, Sawayanagi has played mostly on the ITF Circuit where she has won 14 titles, including a $75K doubles tournament in Japan.

ITF finals

Singles: 9 (3 titles, 6 runner-ups)

Doubles: 20 (11 titles, 9 runner-ups)

Notes

References

External links
 
 
 Japan Tennis Association profile 

1994 births
Living people
Japanese female tennis players
Sportspeople from Hokkaido
People from Hakodate
21st-century Japanese women